= Beaver Ruin Creek =

Stream in Georgia, U.S.

Coordinates: 33°54′59″N 84°06′04″W

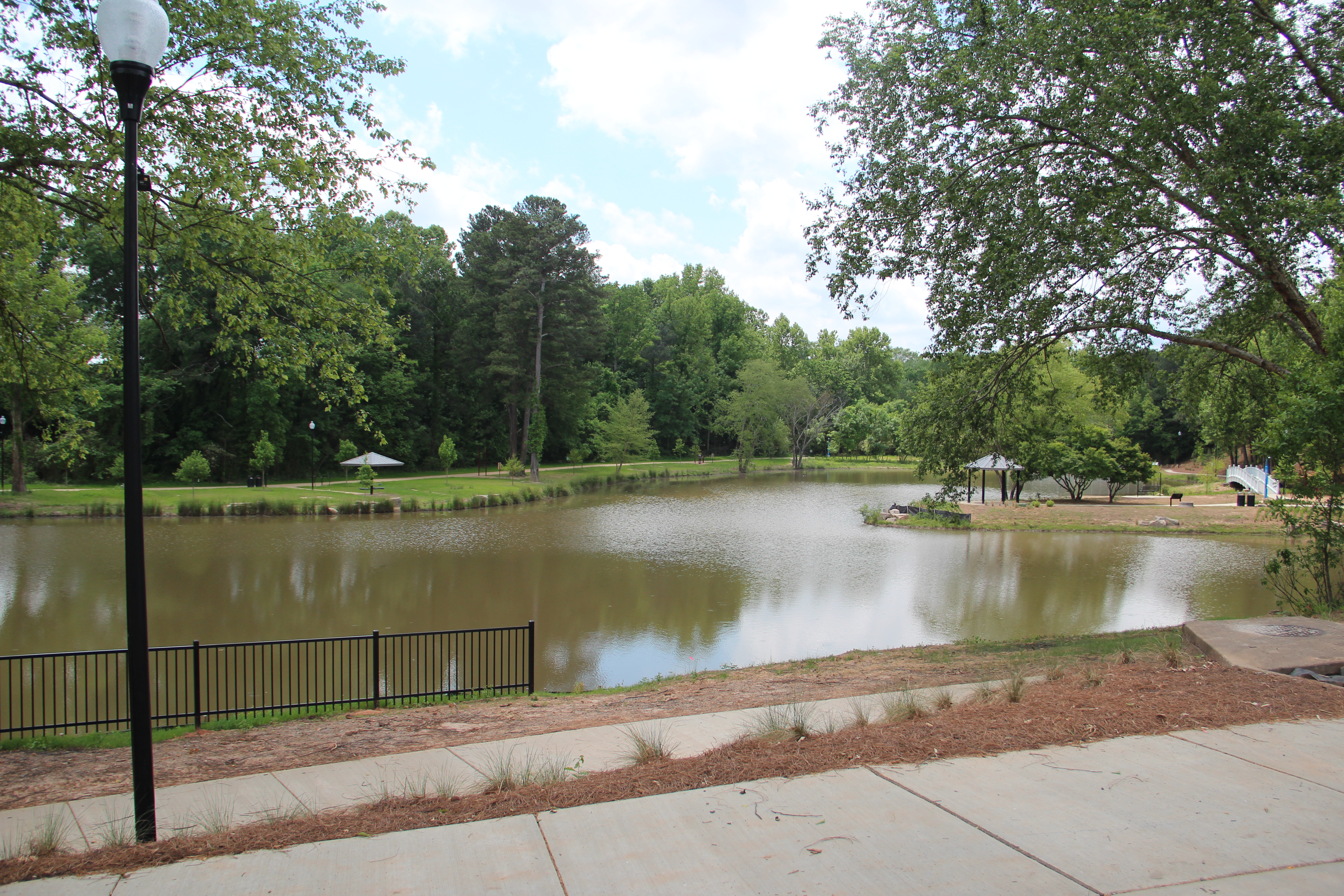
Pinnacle Park, a park along Beaver Ruin Creek

Beaver Ruin Creek is a stream in the U.S. state of Georgia. It is a tributary to Sweetwater Creek.

Beaver Ruin Creek was so named from an incident when the home of "Beaver Toter", a Cherokee, was destroyed in a flood.
